Maxwell Joseph Hall Turner (1907–1960) was a Queen's Counsel and judge of the Mayor's and City of London Court, specifically a Commissioner on the Bench of the Central Criminal Court of England and Wales, the "Old Bailey".

Biography
Turner was a barrister-at-law in the Inner Temple and on the South Eastern Circuit. In addition to his advocacy, Turner was the joint editor of Archbold’s Pleading, Evidence & Practice in Criminal Cases With the Statutes, Precedents of Indictments, etc. and the Evidence Necessary to Support Them (30th edition, Sweet & Maxwell/Stevens & Sons, London 1938).

In 1938, he became engaged to the actor Fabia Drake. He had met her 15 years previously at a gramophone dance at the Turner household, a connexion vitalised through his older brother, dramatist John Hastings Turner, a professional acquaintance of Drake's actor friend Marie Tempest, the promoter of the actors' union, Equity. Turner said he would never commit perjury, even to save Drake's life. They married in December 1938, and Drake gave up her career during the marriage to support him. They had one child, Deirdre, born in March 1940.

Turner disliked working for the defence because of the burden of responsibility should there be no acquittal due to a point overlooked; after prosecuting, he even advised the defence to appeal if he believed they were not properly represented.
He was counsel for the Crown in a number of high-profile cases, including those of the Clapham Common murder trial of five youths and the Notting Hill serial killer and necrophile John Christie, both in 1953, and that of the German petty thief Guenther Podola, who was the last person executed in Great Britain for murdering a police officer, in 1959.

He became a judge in 1958. He was diagnosed with liver cancer the following year but dismissed the pain as indigestion; he was kept unaware of his true condition by doctors at Drake's request. He died after a brief stay in hospital at the age of 53, survived by his wife and daughter.

References

20th-century King's Counsel
1907 births
1960 deaths
20th-century English judges